Gonocerus is a genus of squash bugs belonging to the family Coreidae.

Species
 Gonocerus acuteangulatus  (Goeze, 1778)   
 Gonocerus insidiator  (Fabricius, 1787) 
 Gonocerus juniperi  Herrich-Schäffer, 1839 
 Gonocerus lictor  Horváth, 1879 
 Gonocerus longicornis  Hsiao, 1964 
 Gonocerus lux  Van Reenen, 1981 
 Gonocerus nigrovittatus  Ren, 1984 
 Gonocerus rex  Van Reenen, 1981 
 Gonocerus schoutedeni  Van Reenen, 1981 
 Gonocerus yunnanensis  Hsiao, 1964

References

Gonocerini
Coreidae genera